Beaches in Australia are in abundance due to the fact that Australia is entirely surrounded by the ocean. Beaches are popular destinations among the country's local population, and travellers alike, as over 85% of Australians live on the coast and most of Australia falls under the warm temperate and subtropical climate zones. Australia has a prominent beach culture, which is often considered part of its national identity, with television shows, movies, and songs being set in or relating to beaches. This page features a list of beaches in Australia.

It runs from the Murray mouth to Cape Jaffa.

New South Wales

Sydney
 
 

 Avalon Beach (Northern Beaches)
 Dumas Beach
 Lady Robinsons Beach
 Bondi Beach
 Coogee Beach
 Cronulla Beach
 Shark Island, Cronulla Beach
  Dee Why Beach
 Manly Beach
 Maroubra Beach
 Palm Beach
 Tamarama
 Wattamolla
 Boat Harbour
 Bents Basin
 Lake Parramatta
 Wanda Beach
 Elouera Beach
 Obelisk Beach
 North Cronulla
 Shelly Beach
 Whale Beach
 Ramsgate Beach
 Little Manly Beach
 Greenhills Beach
 Currawong Beach
 Fairy Bower Beach
 Freshwater Beach
 Garie Beach
 Great Mackerel Beach
 Marley Beach
 Turimetta Beach
 Bilgola Beach
 Bronte Beach
 Curl Curl
 Collaroy

Other regions
 Pambula Beach
 Jones Beach
 Duranbah Beach
 Lighthouse Beach
 Angels Beach
 Hyams Beach
 Bar Beach
 Blueys Beach
 Boomerang Beach
 Bream Beach
 Burgess Beach
 Taylors Beach
 Corindi Beach
 Sawtell Beach
 Murray's Beach, Sawtell
 Byron Bay
 Seven Mile Beach
 South Golden Beach
 Stockton Beach
 Werri Beach

Northern Territory
 Mindil Beach, Northern Territory
 Gunn Point Beach, Northern Territory

Queensland

 Mermaid Beach
 Palm Cove
 Four Mile Beach
 Rainbow Beach
 Sunrise Beach
 Sunshine Beach
 Surfers Paradise
 Main Beach
 Southport Spit
 Snapper Rocks
 Coolum Beach
 Cowley Beach
 Shelley Beach
 Bramston Beach
 Airlie Beach
 Greenmount Beach
 Holloways Beach
 Kewarra Beach
 Kings Beach
 Kinka Beach
 Marcus Beach
 Mission Beach
 Newell Beach
 Nudgee Beach
 Palm Beach
 Castaways Beach
 Teewah Beach
 Trinity Beach
 Whitehaven Beach
 Wonga Beach

South Australia

 Aldinga Beach
 Baudin Beach
 Christies Beach
 The Coorong, the longest in Australia
 Henley Beach
 Island Beach
 Maslin Beach
 Middle Beach
 O'Sullivan Beach
 Sellicks Beach
 West Beach

Victoria

 Bells Beach, Torquay
 Brighton
 Ninety Mile Beach
 Bridgewater Bay
Discovery Bay
 Balnarring Beach
 Altona Beach
 Eastern Beach
 Cheviot Beach
 Manns Beach
 Mentone Beach
 Point Impossible Beach
 Safety Beach
 St Andrews Beach
 St Kilda Beach
 Southside Beach
 Sunnyside North Beach
 Thirteenth Beach
 Woodside Beach
 Wreck Beach

Western Australia
 
 Cable Beach
 Cottesloe Beach
 Lucky Bay
 Floreat Beach
 City Beach
 Yallingup
 Coogee
 North Beach
 Eighty Mile Beach 
 Bathers Beach
 Greens Pool
 Middleton Beach
 Elephant Rocks
 Nanarup Beach
 Ocean Beach
 Peppermint Grove Beach
 Preston Beach
 Shell Beach
 Sunset Beach
 Tarcoola Beach
 West Beach

See also
 List of beaches

References

Australia geography-related lists